Gawler is a surname, and may refer to:

 George Gawler (1795–1869), governor of South Australia
 Henry Gawler (1766–1852), English barrister
 Henry Gawler (lawyer) (1827–1894), son of George Gawler, later returned to South Australia as a lawyer
 Ian Gawler (born 1950), Australian author
 John Bellenden Ker Gawler (c.1764–1842), English botanist
 John Cox Gawler (1830–1882), British Israelite author.